Naroki is a town in Pattoki, Punjab, Pakistan. Naroki is divided into different Ismail Town, Hameed Town and Mal Khan Town.

Ismail Town
Ismail Town is situated in Naroki  from the tomb of Hazrat Baba Abbas.

Populated places in Kasur District